Kostadin Adzhov (born 19 May 1991) is a Bulgarian footballer who currently plays as a forward for Rilski Sportist Samokov.

Career

Septemvri Sofia
Kostadin Adzhov joined Septemvri Sofia in the beginning of July after his previous team - Pirin Razlog, merged with Septemvri. He made his debut for the team on 6 August 2016 in a league match against Spartak Pleven and scored 2 of the goals for the 4:0 win. He scored a total of 12 goals helping his team to return in Bulgarian First League after play-offs. On 14 June 2017 he left the club after his contract ended.

Oborishte
On 27 June 2017, Adzhov joined Litex Lovech but a few weeks later signed with Oborishte Panagyurishte.

References

External links

Adzhov Statistic for SV Krenglbach

1991 births
Living people
People from Samokov
Bulgarian footballers
First Professional Football League (Bulgaria) players
Second Professional Football League (Bulgaria) players
PFC Vidima-Rakovski Sevlievo players
PFC Minyor Pernik players
FC Bansko players
FC Septemvri Simitli players
PFC Rilski Sportist Samokov players
FC Pirin Razlog players
FC Septemvri Sofia players
FC Oborishte players
Association football forwards
Sportspeople from Sofia Province